Lee Dong-whun (Korean: 이동훈, born June 25, 1987 in Seoul, South Korea) is a South Korean figure skater. He is the 2004-2008 South Korean national champion.
He trained at the Lake Arrowhead, California while being coached by Rafael Arutyunyan, the former coach of Michelle Kwan.

Results

External links
 

1987 births
Living people
Figure skaters at the 2007 Winter Universiade
Figure skaters from Seoul
South Korean male single skaters
Figure skaters at the 2003 Asian Winter Games
Figure skaters at the 2007 Asian Winter Games